is a Japanese singer, lyricist, composer, novelist, actor, and a film producer.

Sada formed the folk duo Grape with Masami Yoshida in 1972, and they made their debut as recording artists a year afterward. The pair rose to fame owing to the hit song "Shourou Nagashi" composed by Sada, which peaked at the number-two position on the Japanese Oricon chart in 1974. They broke up in 1976, after producing some hit singles including "En-kiri Dera" and "Muen Zaka".

Sada released his first solo album entitled Kikyorai shortly after Grape's dissolution. Following the commercial success of the number-one hit single "Amayadori" (Shelter from the rain) in 1977, he enjoyed a recording career as one of the most popular Japanese male artists during the late 1970s and the first half of the 1980s.

Throughout his career as a musician, Sada released over 35 solo albums and 70 singles, and multiple live albums or compilations. Since the release of Shourou Nagashi, published in 2001, Sada has also worked as a novelist.

Discography

Albums

Grape (with Masami Yoshida) 
 Wasuremono / Lost Property (25 August 1974) 
 Seseragi / Babble (25 May 1975) 
 Communication (25 November 1975)
 Ano Koro ni Tsuite -Season of Raisin- (10 November 1991) / name as 'Raisin'

solo 
 Kikyorai / I Come Back (25 November 1976)
 Kazamidori / Weathercock (25 July 1977)
 Anthology (25 March 1978)
 Yume Kuyo / Memorials of Dreams (10 April 1979)
 Inshoha / Impressionists (10 October 1980)
 Utsuroi / Transition (25 June 1981)
 Yume no Wadachi / Rut of Dreams (11 December 1982)
 Kaze no Omokage / Vestiges of Winds (30 November 1983)
 Glass Age (12 December 1984)
 ADVANTAGE (12 June 1985)
 Jibun Shokogun / Oneself Syndrome (21 December 1985)
 Yume Kaikisen / The Dream Tropic (25 July 1987)
 Kazemachi Dori no Hitobito / People on the Street that is Waiting for Breeze (25 July 1988)
 Yume no Fuku Koro / Time Blowing Dream (25 January 1989)
 Yume Bakari Miteita I Only Dreamed (25 February 1990)
 Yume Kaikisen II / The Dream Tropic Second (25 August 1990)
 Kazoku no Shozo Portrait of a Family (25 July 1991)
 Honobono / Heartwarming (10 November 1992)
 Aimiteno / Rendezvous (25 October 1993)
 Omoide Dorobo / Burglar who Steal Dreams (25 October 1994)
 Sayonara Nippon / Good-bye Japan (25 October 1995)
 Furukusai Koi no Uta Bakari / Just old-fashioned Love Songs (25 October 1996)
 Yumeuta / Dream Song (21 November 1997)
 Kokoro no Jidai ( / Period of Heart (23 September 1998)
 Toki no Sumika / Habitats of Seasons (23 June 1999)
 Nihon Kaku Setsu / Japan Fancied Theory (21 September 2000)
 Alstroemeria (27 February 2002)
 Yume no Tsuzuki / Continuation of a Dream (26 September 2002)
 Slow Life Story (22 October 2003)
 Koibumi / Love Letter (22 September 2004)
 Tokoshie / Forever (7 September 2005)
 Utsukushiki Nihon no Omokage / Beautiful Japanese Vestiges (6 September 2006)
 Mist (12 September 2007)
 Utsukushii Asa / Beautiful Morning (9 June 2009)
 Yokan / Premonition (9 June 2010)
 Sada City (11 July 2011)
 Mou Kurukoro... / Time It Will Come (13 June 2012)
 Dai Ni Gakushou / The Second Movement (10 September 2014)
 Kaze no Kiseki / Track of winds (8 July 2015)
 Reborn ~Umaretate no Sada Masashi~ (4 July 2018)
 Shin-Jibunfudoki I ~Boukyou~ (15 May 2019)
 Shin-Jibunfudoki II ~Mahoroba~ (15 May 2019)
 45th Anniversary Concert Tour 2018 Reborn-Masashi Sada' (26 June 2019)

External links 
 Sada Masashi Official Website 

1952 births
Living people
Japanese male singer-songwriters
Japanese singer-songwriters
People from Nagasaki
Musicians from Nagasaki Prefecture